McKee Hill is a mountain located in the Catskill Mountains of New York west of North Kortright. Quaker Hill is located northeast, Webb Hill is located northwest, Dutch Hill is located northwest, and Gunhouse Hill is located east of Quaker Hill.

References

Mountains of Delaware County, New York
Mountains of New York (state)